Kings Cribbage is a board game released by Cococo Games that counts like cribbage, but plays like a crossword puzzle. It uses a raised-grid gameboard and features playing card tiles, 4 tile holders and a bag.

Game Details

Rules

Game play for Kings Cribbage is much like Scrabble. Players first draw a letter from a bag to see who draws (and goes) first. Unlike Scrabble, however, players only draw 5 tiles rather than 7. The first player chooses a Cribbage hand within his 5 tiles and then places it in a line (in any order) anywhere on the board. The first play must be between 2 and 5 tiles, but all subsequent plays can be anywhere from 1 to 5 tiles. Points are tallied based on the rules of Cribbage. He then restocks his tiles and the play continues to the next person. The next player must then choose a hand (using his tiles and the tiles already on the board) and place it next to the tiles on the board. The game continues until one player has used up all his/her tiles. Players who are caught at the end with tiles must subtract their point values from their hand (subtracted points do not go to the player who went out first). All tiles placed on the board must contribute toward a Cribbage hand (i.e. 6789Q is invalid because the Queen does not add any points to the hand). Hands on the board may not be any more than 5 tiles long but may be as short as 2 tiles. The number 6 can also be used as a 9. Once placed on the board with a designated value of 6 or 9 it can no longer be changed.

Scoring
Scoring for Kings Cribbage is as follows:

Fifteens = 2 pts
Run of 3 = 3 pts
Run of 4 = 4 pts
Run of 5 = 5 pts
Pair = 2 pts
Three of a kind = 6 pts
Four of a kind = 12 pts
Five of a kind = 20 pts

There are 104 tiles representing two decks. Because the decks can be merged in hands and because players may play up to 5 tiles, it is possible to get Five of a kind.

Extra points may be scored for using all 5 of your tiles (10 pts) or arranging a hand so that they're all the same color (10 pts).

External links
Official Kings Cribbage website
Official instructions

Board games introduced in 1997
Cribbage